The House on 56th Street is a 1933 American pre-Code drama film. The film's plot involves a miscarriage of justice, wrongful conviction and imprisonment, and alienation of a prisoner from her only living relative.

Plot summary
Kay Francis stars as a woman sent to prison for twenty years for a murder she did not commit. When she is released, her husband is dead, and her daughter (played by Margaret Lindsay) has been told Peggy is also dead.

Cast
 Kay Francis as Peggy Martin Van Tyle aka Peggy Stone
 Ricardo Cortez as Bill Blaine
 Gene Raymond as Monte Van Tyle (Monty Van Tyle in the opening credits)
 John Halliday as Lyndon Fiske
 Margaret Lindsay as Eleanor Van Tyle Burgess
 Frank McHugh as Chester Hunt
 William "Stage" Boyd as Mr. Bonelli (as William Boyd)
 Hardie Albright as Henry Burgess
 Sheila Terry as Dolly
 Phillip Reed as Freddy
 Walter Walker as Dr. Wyman
 Nella Walker as Eleanor Van Tyle

Reception
According to Warner Bros records, the film earned $410,000 in the U.S. and Canada and $284,000 elsewhere.

References

External links
 
 
 
 

1933 films
American black-and-white films
Films directed by Robert Florey
Films set in New York City
1933 romantic drama films
Warner Bros. films
American romantic drama films
1930s American films
Films scored by Bernhard Kaun
Films about miscarriage of justice